Fernando del Portillo y Torres was a Roman Catholic archbishop in the late 18th and early 19th centuries.

He was the archbishop of Archdiocese of Santo Domingo from 1788 to 1798 and archbishop of "Santafé en Nueva Granada" (now known as the Archdiocese of Bogotá) from 1798 to 1804.

From a wealthy family, he entered the Dominican Order in 1743 at Málaga, Spain, teaching philosophy during 1751–1756, theology, 1756–1758, and Holy Scriptures, 1758–1761. He moved to Cádiz, the seafaring gate of trade to the American Spanish Empire and earned a doctorate of divinity in nearby Jerez de la Frontera in 1767 He became a prior to sieges of the Dominican Order in Málaga, Almería, Cabra, Ciudad Real and Doña Mencía, training teachers of Christianity, dictionary editors  and administrative tutors in aboriginal American Indian languages, North and South America, after the middle of the 16th Century.

In 1788 Charles III of Spain proposed to Pope Pope Pius VI that Portillo be chosen as Archbishop of Santo Domingo, the primate siege of America, created in 1546.

Difficulties on the Island of Hispaniola around 1798 led him to move the supposed remains of seafarer and discoverer Christopher Columbus to  La Habana, Cuba, being kept at the Convent of San Juan de Letrán. Portillo was proposed by the Spanish Crown to the Roman Pope in 1798 as a Bishop of Trujillo, Peru, but instead Portillo became  Archbishop of Bogotá, a much higher position. Del Portillo y Torres died in 1804, aged around 75.

References

 A Turbulent time: the French Revolution and the Greater Caribbean By David Barry Gaspar, David Patrick Geggus, Indiana University Press, 1997; .
 Los Dominicos y el Nuevo Mundo, siglos XVIII-XIX: actas del IVo Congreso ... By José Barrado Barquilla; Editorial San Esteban, 1995; .
 Familias hispanoamericanas, Volume 1 By Emilio Rodríguez Demorizi; Editora Montalvo, 1959.
 Rasgos biográficos de dominicanos célebres By José Gabriel García; Editora del Caribe, 1971.
 The Dominican Republic: a national history By Frank Moya Pons; Markus Wiener Publishers, 1998; .
 Cuba: economía y sociedad, Volume 9 By Leví Marrero; Editorial San Juan, 1985; .
 History of Colombia By Jesús María Henao, Gerardo Arrubla, James Fred Rippy; The University of North Carolina Press, 1938.
 Cuban convents in the age of Enlightened Reform, 1761-1807 By John James Clune; University Press of Florida, 2008; .
 Historia ecclesiastica, Part 4 By Juan Manuel Pacheco;Ediciones Lerner, 1971.
 Historia eclesiástica de la Arquidiócesis de Santo Domingo ..., Volume 3 By Américo Lugo; Editora de Santo Domingo, 1979.
 Haïti 1804—lumières et ténébres: impact et résonances d'une révolution By Léon-François Hoffmann, Frauke Gewecke, Ulrich Fleischmann; Iberoamericana Editorial, 2008; .

External links and additional sources

 (for Chronology of Bishops)
 (for Chronology of Bishops)

1728 births
1804 deaths
18th-century Roman Catholic archbishops in the Dominican Republic
Roman Catholic archbishops of Santo Domingo
Spanish Roman Catholic priests
Roman Catholic archbishops of Bogotá
18th-century Roman Catholic archbishops in New Granada
19th-century Roman Catholic archbishops in New Granada